The York Shakespeare Project (YSP) was set up in 2001 to perform all of Shakespeare's plays within a twenty-year period in the city of York. The project is a registered charity, with a stated aim of providing "a long-term cultural, educational and community resource for the people of York and beyond by involving the wider York community in the production of the whole cycle of Shakespearean drama."

Productions

The list of plays to be performed includes all those in the First Folio, together with Pericles, Prince of Tyre and The Two Noble Kinsmen. Productions have proceeded in approximate chronological order of writing. Productions so far are:

 Richard III, directed by John White, October–November 2002.
 The Taming of the Shrew, directed by Paul Toy, June 2003.
 The Comedy of Errors, directed by Ali Borthwick, December 2003.
 Titus Andronicus, directed by Paul Toy, April 2004.
 Love's Labour's Lost, directed by Chris Rawson, December 2004.
 Romeo & Juliet, directed by Sarah Punshon, July 2005.
 The Project's first outdoor production.
 The Two Gentlemen of Verona, directed by Ali Borthwick, November–December 2005.
 A Midsummer Night's Dream, directed by Mark France, July 2006.
 The audition and rehearsal process for this production was filmed for local Public-access television station York@54, who also broadcast the completed production.
 The Life and Death of King John, directed by Jeremy Muldowney, December 2006.
 Thought to be the first production of this play in York for over 100 years.
 Henry VI, directed by Mark France, June 2007.
 A two part adaptation combining Henry VI, Part 1, Henry VI, Part 2 and Henry VI, Part 3 into parts named Henry VI: The Occupation and Henry VI: Civil War and performed in alternation in the York Guildhall.
 As You Like It, directed by Roger Calvert, July 2008.
 This production was performed in the Gardens of York Minster.
 The Merchant of Venice, directed by Cecily Boys, November 2008.
 Julius Caesar, directed by Mark Smith, June 2009.
Richard II, directed by Hugh Allison, November 2009.
 Henry IV, directed by Tom Cooper,  July–August 2010.
 The two plays Henry IV, Part 1 and Henry IV, Part 2 performed in alternation in the disused medieval church of St Martin-cum-Gregory, Micklegate.
 Much Ado about Nothing, directed by Paul Taylor-Mills, June–July 2011
 Troilus and Cressida, directed by Paul Toy, November 2011
 The Merry Wives of Windsor. directed by Tom Straszewski, May–June 2012
 Othello, directed by Mark France October 2012
 Hamlet, directed by John Topping, again in St Martin-cum-Gregory Church, Micklegate, July–August 2013
 Measure for Measure, directed by Matt Simpson, December 2013
Twelfth Night, directed by Mark Smith, April 2014
All's Well That Ends Well, directed by Maurice Crichton, November 2014
Timon of Athens, directed by Ruby Clarke, May 2015
an all-female production of Henry V, directed by Maggie Smales, October 2015
Pericles, Prince of Tyre, directed by Sophie Paterson, April 2016
King Lear, directed by Ben Prusiner, November–December 2016
Henry VIII, performed in King's Manor, directed by Ben Prusiner, March–April 2017
The Winter's Tale, directed by Natalie Quatermass, October 2017
The Two Noble Kinsmen, directed by Tom Straszewski, May 2018
an all-female production of Coriolanus, directed by Madeleine O’Reilly, November–December 2018
Cymbeline, performed in Merchant Taylors' Hall, directed by Ben Prusiner, March 2019
Antony and Cleopatra, directed by Leo Doulton, October–November 2019
Macbeth, directed by Leo Doulton, prepared for March–April 2020 but postponed due to the COVID-19 pandemic Finally staged October 2021.

Patrons
Patrons include Dame Judi Dench, Sir Antony Sher and Adrian Noble.

References

Theatre in York
William Shakespeare
Amateur theatre companies in England